Fly Advanced (stylized flyADVANCED) is an aircraft management, charter flight and flight training company operating three mid-Atlantic United States locations: Wilmington, Delaware (ILG); Blue Bell, Pennsylvania (LOM) and Lancaster, Pennsylvania (LNS). The company offers executive and personal aircraft management, MRO and FBO services, worldwide air charter, aircraft sales, fractional ownership and rental of private business jets and prop aircraft.

History
Investor, pilot and philanthropist Regis de Ramel formed Air Newport, an air-taxi service, with his twin brother Guillaume in Newport, Rhode Island.

In 2003 he sold Air Newport and in 2007 formed the partnership Stratus Alliance, an air charter operation for Cirrus aircraft owners focused on business travelers.

In 2009, Regis de Ramel purchased the assets of Advanced Aircraft at the Lancaster Airport in Lititz, Pennsylvania and formed Advanced Lancaster LLP, the core of Fly Advanced. The facility operates as a maintenance facility for prop aircraft including Cirrus, Cessna, Diamond, Beechcraft, Piper and others.

In 2011, de Ramel won the contract to manage all operations of Wings Field in Blue Bell, PA. Wings Field provides flight lessons, aircraft rental, charter flights, hangar space, and aircraft maintenance and management for light jet and prop aircraft.

Air Newport, an air taxi service in Newport, Rhode Island returned to Fly Advanced ownership in 2013.

In April 2014, de Ramel bought Aero Ways Inc. in Wilmington Delaware (ILG). Aero Ways was founded in 2001 and grew from a one-plane management company into a full-service aircraft management and worldwide charter provider. It remains the only CAA-certified FBO on the airfield and provides services for aircraft ranging from heavy jet to prop.

In 2015, all of the locations began the process of merging under the unified Fly Advanced brand.

Operations

Fly Advanced offers fully integrated aircraft-related services:

Executive and personal aircraft management - Fly Advanced offers full complete aircraft management services including hangar storage, pilot training, inspections, maintenance, repairs and general upkeep. Fly Advanced offers management clients the ability to offer their aircraft for charter, as well.

Charter - Fly Advanced offers worldwide and regional jet charter with capacities of up to 13 passengers. It also offers local and regional charter flights through its fleet of Cirrus and Piper prop aircraft with capacities of up to 4 passengers.

Flight Training - At Wings Field, the company offers flight lessons including private pilot license, commercial pilot license, and instrumentation rating certification.

MRO Maintenance - The company offers full service maintenance for most manufacturers and models of jets and prop aircraft. In addition, Fly Advanced is a Cirrus Aircraft Authorized Service Center (ASC) and Platinum Training Center. It is the largest Cirrus Authorized Service Center in the United States. Maintenance support is on call 24 hours a day.

FBO (Fixed-Base Operations) and Fueling - Full FBO and fueling services are available at the Wilmington, Delaware (ILG) and Blue Bell, Pennsylvania (LOM) locations. The Wilmington location is the exclusive CAA-certified fuel supplier on the airfield.

Charter fleet
Fly Advanced's fleet offers a mix of heavy and light jet, turboprop and prop aircraft:

Heavy Jet
 Bombardier Challenger 601 - Seats: 10    Base: Wilmington, DE

Super Mid Jet
 Citation Sovereign - Seats: 10    Base: Wilmington, DE
 Dassault Falcon 50 FA50EX - Seats: 9    Base: Wilmington, DE

Light Jet
 Raytheon Beechjet 400A - Seats: 7+1    Base: Wilmington, DE

Turbo Prop
 Pilatus PC-12 Base: Wings Field - Seats: 8

Prop
 Cirrus SR22 -  Seats: 3+1    Base: Philadelphia, PA
 Cirrus SR22T - Seats: 3+1    Base: Philadelphia, PA

Rental fleet
Fly Advanced's fleet an assortment of Cirrus aircraft:

Prop
 4 - Cirrus SR20 - Seats: 4    Base: Blue Bell, PA
 2 - Cirrus SR-22 - Seats: 4    Base: Blue Bell, PA
 2 - Cirrus SR-22T - Seats: 4    Base: Blue Bell, PA

References

External links 
 Fly Advanced website

Companies based in Montgomery County, Pennsylvania
Fractional aircraft ownership companies
Airlines based in Pennsylvania
American companies established in 2009
2009 establishments in Pennsylvania